The 1997 Cleveland Indians season  was a season in American baseball. It involved the Indians making their second World Series appearance in three years. The Indians finished in 1st place in the American League Central Division and hosted the 1997 Major League Baseball All-Star Game.

Offseason
November 13, 1996: Matt Williams was traded by the San Francisco Giants with a player to be named later to the Cleveland Indians for a player to be named later, Jeff Kent, Julián Tavárez, and José Vizcaíno. The Cleveland Indians sent Joe Roa (December 16, 1996) to the San Francisco Giants to complete the trade.
December 10, 1996: Eric Plunk was signed as a free agent with the Cleveland Indians.
 December 13, 1996: Kevin Mitchell signed as a free agent with the Cleveland Indians.
December 16, 1996: Trenidad Hubbard was sent by the San Francisco Giants to the Cleveland Indians to complete an earlier deal made on November 13, 1996.
December 18, 1996: Chad Curtis was signed as a free agent with the Cleveland Indians.
December 19, 1996: Les Norman was signed as a free agent with the Cleveland Indians.
December 28, 1996: Tony Fernandez was signed as a free agent with the Cleveland Indians.
January 1, 1997: Casey Candaele was signed as a free agent with the Cleveland Indians.
January 31, 1997: Greg Cadaret was signed as a free agent with the Cleveland Indians.

Regular season
The season started with several new faces. The Indians acquired home run hitter Matt Williams. On March 25, 1997, the club traded All-Star Kenny Lofton and pitcher Alan Embree to the Atlanta Braves for Marquis Grissom and David Justice.
June 16 – The first interleague game between the Cincinnati Reds and the Cleveland Indians took place at Jacobs Field. The rivalry would be known as the Battle of Ohio. The Reds won the game by a score of 4-1.

Most Starts by Position

Season standings

Record vs. opponents

Notable transactions
April 21, 1997: Ryan Thompson signed as a free agent with the Cleveland Indians.
May 20, 1997: Torey Lovullo was signed as a free agent with the Cleveland Indians.
 June 3, 1997: Kevin Mitchell was released by the Cleveland Indians.
June 5, 1997: Ryan Thompson was traded by the Cleveland Indians to the Toronto Blue Jays for Jeff Manto.
June 9, 1997: Dave Weathers was traded by the New York Yankees to the Cleveland Indians for Chad Curtis.
July 3, 1997: Greg Cadaret was released by the Cleveland Indians.
July 25, 1997: Pat Listach was signed as a free agent with the Cleveland Indians.
July 31, 1997: John Smiley was traded by the Cincinnati Reds with Jeff Branson to the Cleveland Indians for Jim Crowell, Danny Graves, Damian Jackson, and Scott Winchester.
July 31, 1997: Jeff Juden was traded by the Montreal Expos to the Cleveland Indians for Steve Kline.
August 13, 1997: Julio Franco was released by the Cleveland Indians.

Roster

Game log

|- bgcolor="#bbffbb"
| 1 || April 2 || @ Athletics || 9–7 || Kline (1–0) || Wengert (0–1) || Shuey (1) || Oakland–Alameda County Coliseum || 41,235 || 1–0 || W1
|- bgcolor="#ffbbbb"
| 2 || April 3 || @ Athletics || 4–5 || Lewis (1–0) || Plunk (0–1) || Taylor (1) || Oakland–Alameda County Coliseum || 13,707 || 1–1 || L1
|- bgcolor="#ffbbbb"
| 3 || April 4 || @ Angels || 6–8 (11) || Holtz (1–0) || Shuey (0–1) || – || Anaheim Stadium || 17,758 || 1–2 || L2
|- bgcolor="#bbffbb"
| 4 || April 5 || @ Angels || 7–5 || Ogea (1–0) || Hasegawa  (0–1) || Shuey (2) || Anaheim Stadium || 23,913 || 2–2 || W1
|- bgcolor="#bbffbb"
| 5 || April 6 || @ Angels || 10–8 || Kline (2–0) || Percival (0–2) || Jackson (1) || Anaheim Stadium || 29,363 || 3–2 || W2
|- bgcolor="#bbffbb"
| 6 || April 7 || @ Mariners || 8–3 || Nagy (1–0) || Sanders (0–2) || – || Kingdome || 22,012 || 4–2 || W3
|- bgcolor="#ffbbbb"
| 7 || April 8 || @ Mariners || 8–14 || Hurtado (1–0) || Lopez (0–1) || – || Kingdome || 24,348 || 4–3 || L1
|- bgcolor="#ffbbbb"
| 8 || April 9 || @ Mariners || 1–11 || Wolcott (1–1) || Colon (0–1) || – || Kingdome || 28,302 || 4–4 || L2
|- bgcolor="#bbffbb"
| 9 || April 11 || Angels || 15–3 || Ogea (2–0) || Gubicza (0–1) || – || Jacobs Field || 42,643 || 5–4 || W1
|- bgcolor="#bbbbbb"
| – || April 12 || Angels || colspan=8 | Postponed (rain, makeup July 28)
|- bgcolor="#ffbbbb"
| 10 || April 13 || Angels || 3–8 || Langston (1–1) || McDowell (0–1) || – || Jacobs Field || 41,218 || 5–5 || L1
|- bgcolor="#ffbbbb"
| 11 || April 14 || Mariners || 1–6 || Martinez (1–0) || Nagy (1–1) || – || Jacobs Field || 41,184 || 5–6 || L2
|- bgcolor="#ffbbbb"
| 12 || April 15 || Mariners || 4–8 || Wells (1–0) || Jackson (0–1) || Charlton (3) || Jacobs Field || 40,118 || 5–7 || L3
|- bgcolor="#ffbbbb"
| 13 || April 16 || @ Red Sox || 6–11 || Avery (1–1) || Ogea (2–1) || – || Fenway Park || 21,305 || 5–8 || L4
|- bgcolor="#bbffbb"
| 14 || April 17 || @ Red Sox || 4–3 || Kline (3–0) || Trlicek (2–3) || Mesa (1) || Fenway Park || 17,988 || 6–8 || W1
|- bgcolor="#ffbbbb"
| 15 || April 18 || Brewers || 2–10 || McDonald (2–1) || McDowell (0–2) || – || Jacobs Field || 40,343 || 6–9 || L1
|- bgcolor="#bbffbb"
| 16 || April 19 || Brewers || 11–6 || Nagy (2–1) || Eldred (2–1) || – || Jacobs Field || 40,237 || 7–9 || W1
|- bgcolor="#bbffbb"
| 17 || April 20 || Brewers || 6–4 || Hershiser (1–0) || Wickman (2–1) || Mesa (2) || Jacobs Field || 42,285 || 8–9 || W2
|- bgcolor="#ffbbbb"
| 18 || April 22 || Red Sox || 2–8 || Avery (2–1) || Ogea (2–2) || Henry (3) || Jacobs Field || 41,800 || 8–10 || L1
|- bgcolor="#bbffbb"
| 19 || April 23 || Red Sox || 11–7 || McDowell (1–2) || Trlicek (2–4) || – || Jacobs Field || 42,430 || 9–10 || W1
|- bgcolor="#bbffbb"
| 20 || April 24 || @ Brewers || 6–3 || Nagy (3–1) || Eldred (2–2) || Mesa (3) || County Stadium || 7,135 || 10–10 || W2
|- bgcolor="#bbffbb"
| 21 || April 25 || @ Brewers || 11–4 || Hershiser (2–0) || Karl (0–4) || – || County Stadium || 11,150 || 11–10 || W3
|- bgcolor="#ffbbbb"
| 22 || April 26 || @ Brewers || 8–9 || Jones (1–0) || Mesa (0–1) || – || County Stadium || 13,028 || 11–11 || L1
|- bgcolor="#ffbbbb"
| 23 || April 27 || @ Brewers || 5–6 || Jones (2–0) || Plunk (0–2) || – || County Stadium || 19,709 || 11–12 || L2
|- bgcolor="#bbffbb"
| 24 || April 29 || Athletics || 10–4 || Nagy (4–1) || Prieto (2–1) || Jackson (2) || Jacobs Field || 40,421 || 12–12 || W1
|- bgcolor="#ffbbbb"
| 25 || April 30 || Athletics || 9–11 (10) || Taylor (1–1) || Mesa (0–2) || Wengert (1) || Jacobs Field || 40,463 || 12–13 || L1
|-

|- bgcolor="#bbffbb"
| 26 || May 1 || Athletics || 7–1 || McDowell (2–2) || Adams (1–3) || – || Jacobs Field || 42,398 || 13–13 || W1
|- bgcolor="#bbbbbb"
| – || May 2 || Tigers || colspan=8 | Postponed (rain, makeup August 13)
|- bgcolor="#bbffbb"
| 27 || May 3 || Tigers || 7–6 || Plunk (1–2) || Brocail (0–3) || – || Jacobs Field || 42,269 || 14–13 || W2
|- bgcolor="#ffbbbb"
| 28 || May 4 || Tigers || 0–2 || Blair (3–2) || Nagy (4–2) || Brocail (1) || Jacobs Field || 42,387 || 14–14 || L1
|- bgcolor="#bbbbbb"
| – || May 5 || Rangers || colspan=8 | Postponed (rain, makeup August 9)
|- bgcolor="#bbffbb"
| 29 || May 6 || Rangers || 5–4 || Hershiser (3–0) || Pavlik (2–3) || Jackson (3) || Jacobs Field || 40,451 || 15–14 || W1
|- bgcolor="#bbffbb"
| 30 || May 7 || Blue Jays || 7–1 || McDowell (3–2) || Person (0–2) || – || Jacobs Field || 42,463 || 16–14 || W2
|- bgcolor="#ffbbbb"
| 31 || May 8 || Blue Jays || 3–4 || Guzman (3–2) || Ogea (2–3) || Quantrill (1) || Jacobs Field || 42,567 || 16–15 || L1
|- bgcolor="#bbffbb"
| 32 || May 9 || @ Tigers || 5–0 || Nagy (5–2) || Sager (2–2) || – || Tiger Stadium || 20,393 || 17–15 || W1
|- bgcolor="#ffbbbb"
| 33 || May 10 || @ Tigers || 0–6 || Olivares (2–2) || Colon (0–2) || – || Tiger Stadium || 30,578 || 17–16 || L1
|- bgcolor="#ffbbbb"
| 34 || May 11 || @ Tigers || 3–11 || Thompson (3–2) || Hershiser (3–1) || – || Tiger Stadium || 19,869 || 17–17 || L2
|- bgcolor="#ffbbbb"
| 35 || May 12 || @ Rangers || 2–4 || Burkett (2–2) || McDowell (3–3) || Wetteland (9) || The Ballpark in Arlington || 25,327 || 17–18 || L3
|- bgcolor="#bbffbb"
| 36 || May 13 || @ Rangers || 7–3 || Ogea (3–3) || Oliver (1–4) || Morman (1) || The Ballpark in Arlington || 31,798 || 18–18 || W1
|- bgcolor="#ffbbbb"
| 37 || May 14 || @ Rangers || 3–4 (10) || Wetteland (2–0) || Lopez (0–2) || – || The Ballpark in Arlington || 30,268 || 18–19 || L1
|- bgcolor="#ffbbbb"
| 38 || May 16 || @ Blue Jays || 2–5 || Clemens (7–0) || Hershiser (3–2) || Timlin (5) || SkyDome || 35,195 || 18–20 || L2
|- bgcolor="#bbffbb"
| 39 || May 17 || @ Blue Jays || 8–1 || Lopez (1–2) || Williams (1–3) || – || SkyDome || 36,220 || 19–20 || W1
|- bgcolor="#bbffbb"
| 40 || May 18 || @ Blue Jays || 8–6 || Ogea (4–3) || Carpenter (0–2) || Jackson (4) || SkyDome || 31,137 || 20–20 || W2
|- bgcolor="#bbffbb"
| 41 || May 20 || Royals || 4–3 || Shuey (1–1) || Walker (2–2) || Jackson (5) || Jacobs Field || 43,167 || 21–20 || W3
|- bgcolor="#bbffbb"
| 42 || May 21 || Royals || 1–0 || Hershiser (4–2) || Appier (4–3) || Jackson (6) || Jacobs Field || 42,290 || 22–20 || W4
|- bgcolor="#bbffbb"
| 43 || May 22 || Royals || 9–1 || Lopez (2–2) || Rosado (3–3) || – || Jacobs Field || 42,962 || 23–20 || W5
|- bgcolor="#bbffbb"
| 44 || May 23 || Orioles || 6–1 || Ogea (5–3) || Key (8–1) || – || Jacobs Field || 41,154 || 24–20 || W6
|- bgcolor="#ffbbbb"
| 45 || May 24 || Orioles || 3–8 || Mussina (6–1) || Kline (3–1) || – || Jacobs Field || 41,040 || 24–21 || L1
|- bgcolor="#bbffbb"
| 46 || May 25 || Orioles || 7–6 || Nagy (6–2) || Rhodes (2–2) || Morman (2) || Jacobs Field || 42,944 || 25–21 || W1
|- bgcolor="#bbffbb"
| 47 || May 26 || @ White Sox || 10–4 || Hershiser (5–2) || Navarro (4–3) || – || Comiskey Park || 26,383 || 26–21 || W2
|- bgcolor="#ffbbbb"
| 48 || May 27 || @ White Sox || 2–8 || Drabek (4–3) || Lopez (2–3) || – || Comiskey Park || 20,847 || 26–22 || L1
|- bgcolor="#bbffbb"
| 49 || May 28 || @ Royals || 10–3 || Assenmacher (1–0) || Belcher (5–6) || – || Kauffman Stadium || 13,380 || 27–22 || W1
|- bgcolor="#bbbbbb"
| – || May 29 || @ Royals || colspan=8 | Postponed (rain, makeup September 19)
|- bgcolor="#ffbbbb"
| 50 || May 30 || @ Orioles || 0–3 || Mussina (7–1) || Nagy (6–3) || – || Oriole Park at Camden Yards || 47,759 || 27–23 || L1
|- bgcolor="#ffbbbb"
| 51 || May 31 || @ Orioles || 5–8 || Boskie (3–2) || Mesa (0–3) || Myers (17) || Oriole Park at Camden Yards || 47,739 || 27–24 || L2
|-

|- bgcolor="#bbbbbb"
| – || June 1 || @ Orioles || colspan=8 | Postponed (rain, makeup September 15)
|- bgcolor="#bbbbbb"
| – || June 2 || @ Orioles || colspan=8 | Postponed (rain, makeup September 16)
|- bgcolor="#ffbbbb"
| 52 || June 3 || White Sox || 5–9 || Darwin (2–2) || Ogea (5–4) || – || Jacobs Field || 42,994 || 27–25 || L3
|- bgcolor="#ffbbbb"
| 53 || June 4 || White Sox || 4–9 || Baldwin (3–7) || Lopez (2–4) || – || Jacobs Field || 42,992 || 27–26 || L4
|- bgcolor="#bbffbb"
| 54 || June 5 || White Sox || 5–4 (11) || Shuey (2–1) || Castillo (0–1) || – || Jacobs Field || 42,948 || 28–26 || W1
|- bgcolor="#bbffbb"
| 55 || June 6 || @ Red Sox || 7–3 || Hershiser (6–2) || Gordon (3–6) || – || Fenway Park || 30,202 || 29–26 || W2
|- bgcolor="#bbffbb"
| 56 || June 7 || @ Red Sox || 9–5 || Colon (1–2) || Sele (6–5) || – || Fenway Park || 32,780 || 30–26 || W3
|- bgcolor="#ffbbbb"
| 57 || June 8 || @ Red Sox || 6–12 || Hudson (1–0) || Ogea (5–5) || – || Fenway Park || 32,155 || 30–27 || L1
|- bgcolor="#bbffbb"
| 58 || June 10 || Brewers || 5–4 || Nagy (7–3) || Eldred (6–6) || Jackson (7) || Jacobs Field || 42,882 || 31–27 || W1
|- bgcolor="#bbffbb"
| 59 || June 11 || Brewers || 4–3 (11) || Assenmacher (2–0) || Jones (3–3) || – || Jacobs Field || 42,864 || 32–27 || W2
|- bgcolor="#ffbbbb"
| 60 || June 12 || Brewers || 2–6 || Mercedes (3–2) || Anderson (0–1) || – || Jacobs Field || 41,975 || 32–28 || L1
|- bgcolor="#bbbbbb"
| – || June 13 || @ Cardinals || colspan=8 | Postponed (rain, makeup June 14)
|- bgcolor="#bbffbb"
| 61 || June 14 (1) || @ Cardinals || 8–3 || Lopez (3–4) || Mathews (2–3) || – || Busch Stadium || 43,582 || 33–28 || W1
|- bgcolor="#ffbbbb"
| 62 || June 14 (2) || @ Cardinals || 2–5 || Morris (5–3) || Ogea (5–6) || Eckersley (13) || Busch Stadium || 44,532 || 33–29 || L1
|- bgcolor="#bbffbb"
| 63 || June 15 || @ Cardinals || 9–2 || Nagy (8–3) || Stottlemyre (4–5) || – || Busch Stadium || 46,646 || 34–29 || W1
|- bgcolor="#ffbbbb"
| 64 || June 16 || Reds || 1–4 || Tomko (3–1) || Hershiser (6–3) || – || Jacobs Field || 42,961 || 34–30 || L1
|- bgcolor="#bbffbb"
| 65 || June 17 || Reds || 5–1 || Anderson (1–1) || Smiley (5–8) || – || Jacobs Field || 42,901 || 35–30 || W1
|- bgcolor="#ffbbbb"
| 66 || June 18 || Reds || 2–5 || Remlinger (2–3) || Ogea (5–7) || – || Jacobs Field || 42,865 || 35–31 || L1
|- bgcolor="#ffbbbb"
| 67 || June 20 || Yankees || 1–7 || Gooden (2–0) || Nagy (8–4) || – || Jacobs Field || 43,019 || 35–32 || L2
|- bgcolor="#bbffbb"
| 68 || June 21 || Yankees || 13–4 || Hershiser (7–3) || Pettitte (8–5) || – || Jacobs Field || 43,006 || 36–32 || W1
|- bgcolor="#bbffbb"
| 69 || June 22 || Yankees || 5–2 || Anderson (2–1) || Wells (8–4) || Jackson (8) || Jacobs Field || 42,912 || 37–32 || W2
|- bgcolor="#ffbbbb"
| 70 || June 23 || Twins || 2–7 || Radke (8–5) || Ogea (5–8) || – || Jacobs Field || 42,861 || 37–33 || L1
|- bgcolor="#bbffbb"
| 71 || June 24 || Twins || 10–5 || Wright (1–0) || Stevens (0–1) || – || Jacobs Field || 42,902 || 38–33 || W1
|- bgcolor="#bbbbbb"
| – || June 25 || Twins || colspan=8 | Postponed (rain, makeup September 27)
|- bgcolor="#ffbbbb"
| 72 || June 27 || @ Yankees || 2–3 || Gooden (3–0) || Hershiser (7–4) || Rivera (26) || Yankee Stadium || 35,837 || 38–34 || L1
|- bgcolor="#bbffbb"
| 73 || June 28 || @ Yankees || 12–8 || Plunk (2–2) || Rogers (4–4) || – || Yankee Stadium || 41,085 || 39–34 || W1
|- bgcolor="#ffbbbb"
| 74 || June 29 || @ Yankees || 10–11 || Rivera (2–2) || Mesa (0–4) || – || Yankee Stadium || 39,756 || 39–35 || L1
|- bgcolor="#bbffbb"
| 75 || June 30 || @ Astros || 6–4 || Mesa (1–4) || Martin (2–2) || Jackson (9) || Astrodome || 29,051 || 40–35 || W1
|-

|- bgcolor="#bbffbb"
| 76 || July 1 || @ Astros || 8–6 || Plunk (3–2) || Lima (1–4) || Jackson (10) || Astrodome || 23,998 || 41–35 || W2
|- bgcolor="#ffbbbb"
| 77 || July 2 || @ Astros || 2–6 || Hampton (4–7) || Hershiser (7–5) || – || Astrodome || 25,661 || 41–36 || L1
|- bgcolor="#bbffbb"
| 78 || July 4 || Royals || 7–6 || Anderson (3–1) || Pichardo (2–4) || Jackson (11) || Jacobs Field || 42,984 || 42–36 || W1
|- bgcolor="#bbffbb"
| 79 || July 5 || Royals || 8–4 || Nagy (9–4) || Pittsley (2–6) || – || Jacobs Field || 42,892 || 43–36 || W2
|- bgcolor="#bbffbb"
| 80 || July 6 || Royals || 8–7 || Jackson (1–1) || Casian (0–2) || – || Jacobs Field || 42,863 || 44–36 || W3
|- bgcolor=#bbcaff
| – || July 8 || 68th All-Star Game || colspan=8 | National League vs. American League (Jacobs Field, Cleveland, Ohio)
|- bgcolor="#ffbbbb"
| 81 || July 10 || @ Twins || 2–8 || Radke (11–5) || Nagy (9–5) || – || Hubert H. Humphrey Metrodome || 13,605 || 44–37 || L1
|- bgcolor="#bbffbb"
| 82 || July 11 || @ Twins || 5–1 || Jacome (1–0) || Robertson (7–7) || – || Hubert H. Humphrey Metrodome || 14,400 || 45–37 || W1
|- bgcolor="#bbffbb"
| 83 || July 12 || @ Twins || 7–2 || Hershiser (8–5) || Tewksbury (4–8) || – || Hubert H. Humphrey Metrodome || 30,055 || 46–37 || W2
|- bgcolor="#bbffbb"
| 84 || July 13 || @ Twins || 12–5 || Colon (2–2) || Hawkins (1–5) || – || Hubert H. Humphrey Metrodome || 16,734 || 47–37 || W3
|- bgcolor="#bbffbb"
| 85 || July 14 || @ Yankees || 3–2 (10) || Jackson (2–1) || Rivera (2–3) || – || Yankee Stadium || 27,812 || 48–37 || W4
|- bgcolor="#ffbbbb"
| 86 || July 15 || @ Yankees || 6–12 || Irabu (2–0) || Nagy (9–6) || Mendoza (1) || Yankee Stadium || 34,503 || 48–38 || L1
|- bgcolor="#bbffbb"
| 87 || July 16 || @ Brewers || 4–3 || Wright (2–0) || McDonald (8–7) || Jackson (12) || County Stadium || 23,047 || 49–38 || W1
|- bgcolor="#bbffbb"
| 88 || July 17 || @ Brewers || 3–2 || Hershiser (9–5) || Eldred (9–9) || Jackson (13) || County Stadium || 23,383 || 50–38 || W2
|- bgcolor="#ffbbbb"
| 89 || July 18 || Red Sox || 0–7 || Wakefield (4–10) || Colon (2–3) || – || Jacobs Field || 43,037 || 50–39 || L1
|- bgcolor="#ffbbbb"
| 90 || July 19 || Red Sox || 3–6 || Suppan (4–0) || Clark (0–1) || Slocumb (14) || Jacobs Field || 43,070 || 50–40 || L2
|- bgcolor="#bbffbb"
| 91 || July 20 || Red Sox || 7–2 || Nagy (10–6) || Gordon (5–8) || – || Jacobs Field || 42,932 || 51–40 || W1
|- bgcolor="#ffbbbb"
| 92 || July 21 || Red Sox || 1–3 || Avery (4–2) || Wright (2–1) || Slocumb (15) || Jacobs Field || 42,851 || 51–41 || L1
|- bgcolor="#bbffbb"
| 93 || July 22 || Mariners || 6–2 || Weathers (1–1) || Fassero (8–6) || Jackson (14) || Jacobs Field || 42,951 || 52–41 || W1
|- bgcolor="#ffbbbb"
| 94 || July 23 || Mariners || 3–6 || Olivares (6–6) || Colon (2–4) || Holzemer (1) || Jacobs Field || 43,049 || 52–42 || L1
|- bgcolor="#ffbbbb"
| 95 || July 24 || Mariners || 1–11 || Johnson (14–2) || Clark (0–2) || – || Jacobs Field || 42,984 || 52–43 || L2
|- bgcolor="#ffbbbb"
| 96 || July 25 || Athletics || 1–2 || Small (7–4) || Jackson (2–2) || Taylor (19) || Jacobs Field || 42,945 || 52–44 || L3
|- bgcolor="#bbffbb"
| 97 || July 26 || Athletics || 6–3 || Wright (3–1) || Karsay (3–10) || – || Jacobs Field || 42,925 || 53–44 || W1
|- bgcolor="#bbffbb"
| 98 || July 27 || Athletics || 4–2 || Jacome (2–0) || Haynes (0–1) || Assenmacher (1) || Jacobs Field || 42,885 || 54–44 || W2
|- bgcolor="#ffbbbb"
| 99 || July 28 (1) || Angels || 0–2 || Springer (6–4) || Colon (2–5) || – || Jacobs Field || 43,033 || 54–45 || L1
|- bgcolor="#ffbbbb"
| 100 || July 28 (2) || Angels || 7–10 || Harris (2–2) || Weathers (1–2) || Holtz (2) || Jacobs Field || 42,857 || 54–46 || L2
|- bgcolor="#ffbbbb"
| 101 || July 29 || Angels || 2–7 || Finley (10–6) || Clark (0–3) || – || Jacobs Field || 42,975 || 54–47 || L3
|- bgcolor="#ffbbbb"
| 102 || July 30 || Angels || 2–5 || Hill (6–8) || Nagy (10–7) || James (7) || Jacobs Field || 42,898 || 54–48 || L4
|-

|- bgcolor="#bbffbb"
| 103 || August 1 || @ Rangers || 8–5 || Mesa (2–4) || Gunderson (2–1) || Assenmacher (2) || The Ballpark in Arlington || 44,859 || 55–48 || W1
|- bgcolor="#bbffbb"
| 104 || August 2 || @ Rangers || 7–3 || Smiley (10–10) || Witt (10–7) || – || The Ballpark in Arlington || 23,266 || 56–48 || W2
|- bgcolor="#ffbbbb"
| 105 || August 3 || @ Rangers || 7–8 || Wetteland (6–2) || Jackson (2–3) || – || The Ballpark in Arlington || 42,303 || 56–49 || L1
|- bgcolor="#bbffbb"
| 106 || August 4 || @ Tigers || 7–2 || Nagy (11–7) || Sanders (3–9) || – || Tiger Stadium || 26,832 || 57–49 || W1
|- bgcolor="#ffbbbb"
| 107 || August 5 || @ Tigers || 4–6 || Thompson (10–8) || Plunk (3–3) || Jones (22) || Tiger Stadium || 24,824 || 57–50 || L1
|- bgcolor="#ffbbbb"
| 108 || August 6 || @ Blue Jays || 3–6 || Hentgen (12–7) || Lopez (3–5) || Escobar (7) || SkyDome || 36,463 || 57–51 || L2
|- bgcolor="#ffbbbb"
| 109 || August 7 || @ Blue Jays || 0–4 || Clemens (17–4) || Smiley (10–11) || – || SkyDome || 35,194 || 57–52 || L3
|- bgcolor="#ffbbbb"
| 110 || August 8 || Rangers || 5–6 || Bailes (1–0) || Jackson (2–4) || Wetteland (23) || Jacobs Field || 43,110 || 57–53 || L4
|- bgcolor="#ffbbbb"
| 111 || August 9 (1) || Rangers || 3–4 || Clark (1–3) || Nagy (11–8) || Wetteland (24) || Jacobs Field || 42,964 || 57–54 || L5
|- bgcolor="#bbffbb"
| 112 || August 9 (2) || Rangers || 4–2 || Assenmacher (3–0) || Moody (0–1) || Mesa (4) || Jacobs Field || 41,330 || 58–54 || W1
|- bgcolor="#ffbbbb"
| 113 || August 10 || Rangers || 6–7 || Whiteside (2–1) || Juden (11–6) || Wetteland (25) || Jacobs Field || 42,902 || 58–55 || L1
|- bgcolor="#bbffbb"
| 114 || August 12 || Tigers || 7–4 || Plunk (4–3) || Keagle (0–2) || Mesa (5) || Jacobs Field || 32,992 || 59–55 || W1
|- bgcolor="#ffbbbb"
| 115 || August 13 (1) || Tigers || 3–13 || Blair (12–5) || Smiley (10–12) || – || Jacobs Field || N/A || 59–56 || L1
|- bgcolor="#bbffbb"
| 116 || August 13 (2) || Tigers || 9–1 || Hershiser (10–5) || Dishman (1–1) || – || Jacobs Field || 42,673 || 60–56 || W1
|- bgcolor="#bbffbb"
| 117 || August 14 || Tigers || 12–1 || Nagy (12–8) || Sanders (4–10) || – || Jacobs Field || 42,936 || 61–56 || W2
|- bgcolor="#bbffbb"
| 118 || August 15 || Blue Jays || 5–4 (10) || Assenmacher (4–0) || Crabtree (2–3) || – || Jacobs Field || 43,011 || 62–56 || W3
|- bgcolor="#bbffbb"
| 119 || August 16 || Blue Jays || 8–4 || Shuey (3–1) || Quantrill (5–5) || – || Jacobs Field || 42,908 || 63–56 || W4
|- bgcolor="#ffbbbb"
| 120 || August 17 || Blue Jays || 5–10 || Clemens (19–4) || Wright (3–2) || – || Jacobs Field || 42,861 || 63–57 || L1
|- bgcolor="#bbffbb"
| 121 || August 18 || Blue Jays || 5–3 || Hershiser (11–5) || Williams (7–11) || Mesa (6) || Jacobs Field || 42,471 || 64–57 || W1
|- bgcolor="#bbffbb"
| 122 || August 19 || @ Mariners || 7–5 || Smiley (11–12) || Cloude (1–2) || Mesa (7) || Kingdome || 33,645 || 65–57 || W2
|- bgcolor="#ffbbbb"
| 123 || August 20 || @ Mariners || 0–1 || Johnson (17–4) || Nagy (12–9) || Slocumb (20) || Kingdome || 32,546 || 65–58 || L1
|- bgcolor="#ffbbbb"
| 124 || August 21 || @ Mariners || 6–7 || Moyer (13–4) || Colon (2–6) || Slocumb (21) || Kingdome || 30,395 || 65–59 || L2
|- bgcolor="#bbffbb"
| 125 || August 22 || @ Athletics || 5–3 || Wright (4–2) || Prieto (6–8) || Mesa (8) || Oakland–Alameda County Coliseum || 11,451 || 66–59 || W1
|- bgcolor="#bbffbb"
| 126 || August 23 || @ Athletics || 7–4 || Hershiser (12–5) || Rigby (0–5) || Mesa (9) || Oakland–Alameda County Coliseum || 17,066 || 67–59 || W2
|- bgcolor="#ffbbbb"
| 127 || August 24 || @ Athletics || 1–4 || Haynes (2–3) || Smiley (11–13) || Mathews (1) || Oakland–Alameda County Coliseum || 20,074 || 67–60 || L1
|- bgcolor="#ffbbbb"
| 128 || August 26 || @ Angels || 7–8 || May (1–1) || Plunk (4–4) || – || Anaheim Stadium || 21,012 || 67–61 || L2
|- bgcolor="#bbffbb"
| 129 || August 27 || @ Angels || 10–4 || Wright (5–2) || Watson (11–8) || – || Anaheim Stadium || 20,140 || 68–61 || W1
|- bgcolor="#bbffbb"
| 130 || August 29 || Cubs || 7–6 || Mesa (3–4) || Stevens (1–4) || – || Jacobs Field || 43,060 || 69–61 || W2
|- bgcolor="#ffbbbb"
| 131 || August 30 || Cubs || 4–9 || Tapani (4–3) || Smiley (11–14) || – || Jacobs Field || 43,044 || 69–62 || L1
|- bgcolor="#bbffbb"
| 132 || August 31 || Cubs || 9–5 || Nagy (13–9) || Batista (0–3) || Assenmacher (3) || Jacobs Field || 43,013 || 70–62 || W1
|-

|- bgcolor="#bbffbb"
| 133 || September 1 || @ Pirates || 7–5 || Ogea (6–8) || Cooke (9–14) || Mesa (10) || Three Rivers Stadium || 45,298 || 71–62 || W2
|- bgcolor="#ffbbbb"
| 134 || September 2 || @ Pirates || 4–6 || Silva (1–0) || Wright (5–3) || Loiselle (25) || Three Rivers Stadium || 43,380 || 71–63 || L1
|- bgcolor="#bbffbb"
| 135 || September 3 || @ Pirates || 7–3 || Hershiser (13–5) || Loaiza (10–10) || – || Three Rivers Stadium || 37,513 || 72–63 || W1
|- bgcolor="#bbffbb"
| 136 || September 5 || White Sox || 11–1 || Nagy (14–9) || Bere (3–1) || – || Jacobs Field || 43,093 || 73–63 || W2
|- bgcolor="#bbffbb"
| 137 || September 6 || White Sox || 9–7 || Colon (3–6) || Baldwin (11–14) || Mesa (11) || Jacobs Field || 43,055 || 74–63 || W3
|- bgcolor="#bbffbb"
| 138 || September 7 || White Sox || 5–2 || Wright (6–3) || Drabek (10–10) || Mesa (12) || Jacobs Field || 43,051 || 75–63 || W4
|- bgcolor="#bbffbb"
| 139 || September 8 || Orioles || 2–1 ||Assenmacher (5–0) || Mills (2–2) || Mesa (13) || Jacobs Field || 43,009 || 76–63 || W5
|- bgcolor="#ffbbbb"
| 140 || September 9 || Orioles || 3–9 (8) || Krivda (4–0) || Ogea (6–9) || – || Jacobs Field || 43,045 || 76–64 || L1
|- bgcolor="#ffbbbb"
| 141 || September 11 || @ White Sox || 5–7 || Foulke (3–5) || Nagy (14–10) || Karchner (14) || Comiskey Park || 22,620 || 76–65 || L2
|- bgcolor="#bbffbb"
| 142 || September 12 || @ White Sox || 9–0 || Wright (7–3) || Drabek (10–11) || – || Comiskey Park || 31,249 || 77–65 || W1
|- bgcolor="#ffbbbb"
| 143 || September 13 || @ White Sox || 6–7 || Sirotka (2–0) || Hershiser (13–6) || Karchner (15) || Comiskey Park || 32,306 || 77–66 || L1
|- bgcolor="#bbffbb"
| 144 || September 14 || @ White Sox || 8–3 || Shuey (4–1) || Darwin (0–1) || – || Comiskey Park || 32,485 || 78–66 || W1
|- bgcolor="#ffbbbb"
| 145 || September 15 (1) || @ Orioles || 5–6 || Benitez (4–4) || Plunk (4–5) || Myers (42) || Oriole Park at Camden Yards || 41,602 || 78–67 || L1
|- bgcolor="#bbffbb"
| 146 || September 15 (2) || @ Orioles || 4–1 || Ogea (7–9) || Krivda (4–1) || Mesa (14) || Oriole Park at Camden Yards || 47,110 || 79–67 || W1
|- bgcolor="#bbffbb"
| 147 || September 16 (1) || @ Orioles || 4–2 || Nagy (15–10) || Rodriguez (0–1) || Mesa (15) || Oriole Park at Camden Yards || 38,022 || 80–67 || W2
|- bgcolor="#ffbbbb"
| 148 || September 16 (2) || @ Orioles || 2–7 || Key (16–9) || Weathers (1–3) || – || Oriole Park at Camden Yards || 46,185 || 80–68 || L1
|- bgcolor="#bbffbb"
| 149 || September 17 || @ Twins || 7–6 || Wright (8–3) || Miller (0–4) || Mesa (16) || Hubert H. Humphrey Metrodome || 9,512 || 81–68 || W1
|- bgcolor="#bbffbb"
| 150 || September 18 || @ Twins || 4–1 || Hershiser (14–6) || Tewksbury (6–13) ||  Jackson (15) || Hubert H. Humphrey Metrodome || 9,564 || 82–68 || W2
|- bgcolor="#ffbbbb"
| 151 || September 19 (1) || @ Royals || 3–10 || Belcher (13–12) || Colon (3–7) || – || Kauffman Stadium || N/A || 82–69 || L1
|- bgcolor="#bbffbb"
| 152 || September 19 (2) || @ Royals || 6–2 || Anderson (4–1) || Bones (3–8) || Assenmacher (4) || Kauffman Stadium || 16,973 || 83–69 || W1
|- bgcolor="#ffbbbb"
| 153 || September 20 || @ Royals || 2–5 || Olson (4–3) || Lopez (3–6) || Montgomery (14) || Kauffman Stadium || 19,125 || 83–70 || L1
|- bgcolor="#ffbbbb"
| 154 || September 21 || @ Royals || 0–1 || Bevil (1–2) || Jackson (2–5) || – || Kauffman Stadium || 15,274 || 83–71 || L2
|- bgcolor="#bbbbbb"
| – || September 22 || @ Royals || colspan=8 | Cancelled (rain)
|- bgcolor="#bbffbb"
| 155 || September 23 || Yankees || 10–9 || Mesa (4–4) || Nelson (3–7) || – || Jacobs Field || 43,039 || 84–71 || W1
|- bgcolor="#ffbbbb"
| 156 || September 24 || Yankees || 4–8 || Gooden (9–5) || Anderson (4–2) || – || Jacobs Field || 42,976 || 84–72 || L1
|- bgcolor="#ffbbbb"
| 157 || September 25 || Yankees || 4–5 (10) || Mendoza (8–6) || Shuey (4–2) || Stanton (3) || Jacobs Field || 43,004 || 84–73 || L2
|- bgcolor="#bbffbb"
| 158 || September 26 || Twins || 7–2 || Ogea (8–9) || Radke (20–10) || – || Jacobs Field || 42,895 || 85–73 || W1
|- bgcolor="#bbffbb"
| 159 || September 27 (1) || Twins || 10–6 || Colon (4–7) || Miller (1–5) || – || Jacobs Field || 42,854 || 86–73 || W2
|- bgcolor="#ffbbbb"
| 160 || September 27 (2) || Twins || 4–6 (10) || Aguilera (5–4) || Lopez (3–7) || – || Jacobs Field || 42,867 || 86–74 || L1
|- bgcolor="#ffbbbb"
| 161 || September 28 || Twins || 1–5 || Tewksbury (8–13) || Nagy (15–11) || – || Jacobs Field || 42,940 || 86–75 || L2
|-

|- style="text-align:center;"
| Legend:       = Win       = Loss       = PostponementBold = Indians team member

All-Star game

The 1997 Major League Baseball All-Star Game was the 68th playing of the midsummer classic between the all-stars of the American League (AL) and National League (NL). There were no members of the Indians in the starting lineup although three Indians (Sandy Alomar Jr., Jim Thome, and David Justice) were named to the team. The game was held on July 8, 1997, and the first pitch was thrown by former Indian Larry Doby. The American League were victorious 3 – 1, with the go ahead HR coming courtesy Alomar Jr.

Player stats

Batting

Starters by position
Note: Pos = Position; G = Games played; AB = At bats; H = Hits; Avg. = Batting average; HR = Home runs; RBI = Runs batted in

Other batters
Note: G = Games played; AB = At bats; H = Hits; Avg. = Batting average; HR = Home runs; RBI = Runs batted in

Pitching

Starting pitchers
Note: G = Games pitched; IP = Innings pitched; W = Wins; L = Losses; ERA = Earned run average; SO = Strikeouts

Other pitchers
Note: G = Games pitched; IP = Innings pitched; W = Wins; L = Losses; ERA = Earned run average; SO = Strikeouts

Relief pitchers 
Note: G = Games pitched; W = Wins; L = Losses; SV = Saves; ERA = Earned run average; SO = Strikeouts

American League Division Series

Cleveland Indians vs. New York Yankees

Game 1
September 30, Yankee Stadium

Game 2
October 2, Yankee Stadium

Game 3
October 4, Jacobs Field

Game 4
October 5, Jacobs Field

Game 5
October 6, Jacobs Field

American League Championship Series

Game 1
October 8, Camden Yards

Game 2
October 9, Camden Yards

Game 3
October 11, Jacobs Field

Game 4
October 12, Jacobs Field

Game 5
October 13, Jacobs Field

Game 6
October 15, Camden Yards

World Series

Game 1
October 18, 1997, at Pro Player Stadium in Miami

Game 2
October 19, 1997, at Pro Player Stadium in Miami

Game 3
October 21, 1997, at Jacobs Field in Cleveland, Ohio

Game 4
October 22, 1997, at Jacobs Field in Cleveland, Ohio

Game 5
October 23, 1997, at Jacobs Field in Cleveland, Ohio

Game 6
October 25, 1997, at Pro Player Stadium in Miami

Game 7
October 26, 1997, at Pro Player Stadium in Miami

Award winners
 Marquis Grissom, Outfield, ALCS MVP

All-Star Game
 Sandy Alomar Jr., catcher, reserve
 Jim Thome, first baseman, reserve
 David Justice, Outfield, elected to start, but was unable to play due to an injury.

Minor league affiliates

References

1997 Cleveland Indians at Baseball Reference
1997 Cleveland Indians at Baseball Almanac
1997 WS at Baseball Reference

Cleveland Guardians seasons
American League champion seasons
Cleveland Indians season
American League Central champion seasons
Cleve